The following is a list of notable people who have lived in Cleveland, Tennessee.

Notable people

 Travis Beacham, screenwriter, wrote the screenplay for the 2010 film Clash of the Titans and Pacific Rim
 William B. Breuer, author of The Great Raid and dozens of other books based on actual accounts of war
 Kevin Brooks, member of the Tennessee House of Representatives, mayor
 Anthony Burger, southern gospel pianist, played for the Kingsmen Quartet for several years and was the pianist for the Gaither Vocal Band and the Gaither Homecoming series
 Charles Paul Conn, author and university president
 Charles W. Conn, author and university president
 Phil Driscoll, trumpet player and founder of Mighty Horn Ministries
 Doyle Dykes, guitarist
 Richard M. Edwards, state legislator and Union Army colonel 
 Mark Hall, member of the Tennessee House of Representatives District 24
 David Holsinger, concert band composer and conductor
 Rhyne Howard, WNBA Player
Dan Howell, member of the Tennessee House of Representatives
 Paul B. Huff, World War II soldier and Medal of Honor recipient
 Brittany Jackson, WNBA player
 Doc Johnston, Major League Baseball player, played in 11 seasons, seven with the Cleveland Indians.  Brother of Jimmy Johnston.
 Jimmy Johnston, Major League Baseball player, appeared in 1916 and 1920 World Series.  Brother of Doc Johnston.
 Allan Jones, businessman and founder of Check Into Cash Inc.
 Bob Jones III, third president of Bob Jones University
 Dale Jones, former NFL player, assistant coach at Appalachian State
 Alan J. Lacy, businessman and former CEO of Sears, Roebuck and Company.
 Jacques McClendon, NFL offensive guard
 Jerry McKenna, American sculptor and author (attended Bradley Central High School 1953–1954) 
 Toby McKenzie, businessman and founder of National Cash Advance.
 Darnell Mee, professional basketball player
 J. Chris Newton, former state representative
 Billie Nipper, noted horse artist
 Forrest Preston, owner, chairman and CEO of Life Care Centers of America
 Julius Eckhardt Raht, mining engineer and entrepreneur
 Jeremi Richardson, member of the contemporary Christian music group Avalon
 Tom Rowland, former mayor who was the longest-serving in Tennessee history
 Alvin Scott, former NBA player
 Steve Sloan former NFL player with Atlanta Falcons, All-American QB under Bear Bryant at Alabama, former All-State football and basketball at Bradley Central High School.
 Phil Stacey, American Idol contestant; Lee University alumnus
 Perry Stone (minister), international evangelist and author
 Eric Watson, member of the Tennessee House of Representatives
 Mark Wills, country music singer
 Vincent Yarbrough, former NBA player, Denver Nuggets (2002-2003)

See also
 List of people from Tennessee

References

 
Cleveland, Tennessee
Cleveland